Rita grandiscutata is an extinct species of catfish of the family Bagridae.

Bagridae